Kang Airport  is an airport serving the village of Kang, in the Kgalagadi District of Botswana.

The Kang VOR (Ident: KGV) is located on field.

See also

Transport in Botswana
List of airports in Botswana

References

External links
OpenStreetMap - Kang
OurAirports - Kang
FalllingRain - Kang

Airports in Botswana
Kgalagadi District